= Moral Panics over Contemporary Children and Youth =

2008 book

- Author: Charles Krinsky
- Language: English
- Subject: Social science
- Published: Routledge
- Publication date: 2008
- Publication place: United Kingdom
- Pages: 256
- ISBN: 9781315248684

Moral Panics over Contemporary Children and Youth is a book edited by Charles Krinsky, published by Routledge in 2008.
